Star Trek: The Worlds of the Federation is a 1989 Star Trek reference manual written and illustrated by Lora Johnson.

The book is a manual of the worlds of the United Federation of Planets and their respective inhabitants and covers not only the stories from the original Star Trek but also from Star Trek: The Next Generation and Star Trek: The Animated Series.

Star Trek reference books
Books with cover art by Don Ivan Punchatz
Pocket Books books